Viktor Nestrašil (born December 31, 1996) is a Czech professional ice hockey winger. He is currently a free agent having last played for the Solway Sharks of the National Ice Hockey League Division 1 and the Scottish National League.

Nestrašil previously played two games in Liiga for Tappara during the 2016–17 season. He has also played in the 1st Czech Republic Hockey League for HC Slavia Praha, LHK Jestřábi Prostějov and HC Frýdek-Místek before moving to the Solway Sharks on February 1, 2020.

Nestrašil is the younger brother of former NHL player Andrej Nestrašil.

References

External links

1996 births
Living people
Czech ice hockey forwards
HC Frýdek-Místek players
HC Kobra Praha players
HC RT Torax Poruba players
HC Slavia Praha players
LHK Jestřábi Prostějov players
KLH Vajgar Jindřichův Hradec players
Solway Sharks players
Ice hockey people from Prague
Tappara players
Czech expatriate ice hockey people
Czech expatriate sportspeople in Scotland
Expatriate ice hockey players in Scotland
Czech expatriate ice hockey players in Finland